Denis Dmitrievich Bachurin (born June 7, 1991) a Russian professional ice hockey defenceman who currently plays for HC Almaty of the Kazakhstan Hockey Championship.

References

External links

1991 births
Living people
Russian ice hockey defencemen
Nomad Astana players
Barys Nur-Sultan players
Sibirskie Snaipery players
Snezhnye Barsy players
HC Almaty players
HC Astana players
Sportspeople from Novosibirsk